Tadpole and the Whale is a Canadian children's fantasy film, directed by Jean-Claude Lord and released in 1988 as part of the Tales for All series.

The film stars Fanny Lauzier as Daphné, a young girl living in Mingan, Quebec who has developed the ability to breathe underwater, and who has befriended the dolphins and the whales living near the town in the Gulf of St. Lawrence. The film's cast also includes Denis Forest, Marina Orsini, Félix-Antoine Leroux, Jean Lajeunesse, Lise Thouin, Louise Richer, Thomas Donohue, Roland Laroche, Pierre-Olivier Gagnon, Jean-Pierre Leduc, Jean Lafontaine, Jean Lemire, André Doyle, Claude Grisé and Alie Lavoie Gray.

The film garnered three Genie Award nominations at the 10th Genie Awards in 1989, including Best Original Screenplay, Best Cinematography (Thomas Burstyn) and Best Original Song for "We Are One (Sous la mer)" (Normand Dubé, Guy Trépanier and Nathalie Carson). It also won the Golden Reel Award as the year's top-grossing Canadian film with a gross of C$1.79 million just from Quebec, before it had even opened in English Canada.

References

External links
 
 

1988 films
1988 independent films
Canadian children's fantasy films
Films directed by Jean-Claude Lord
Films produced by Jacques Bobet
Films about dolphins
Films about whales
Canadian independent films
1980s children's films
French-language Canadian films
1980s Canadian films